Abraham Creighton, 2nd Earl Erne (10 May 1765 – 10 June 1842), was an Irish peer and politician.

He was the elder son of The 1st Earl Erne, by his first wife, Catherine Howard. Between 1790 and 1798, he represented Lifford in the Irish House of Commons. In Dublin, he was a member of the Kildare Street Club.

In November 1798, Abraham was declared insane. He was then incarcerated in Brooke House, London, for the next forty years. On his father's death in 1828, Abraham became the second Earl, although still incarcerated and officially insane.

He died in 1842, within months of the death of his father's second wife, Lady Mary Hervey, daughter of The 4th Earl of Bristol, Church of Ireland Bishop of Derry. Lord Erne was unmarried and without descendants. The title and the estates including Crom Castle passed to his nephew John Creighton, the third Earl. The third Earl subsequently changed the spelling of the family name to Crichton, which spelling is maintained to this day by the Earl of Erne.

Notes

1762 births
1848 deaths
Irish MPs 1790–1797
Members of the Parliament of Ireland (pre-1801) for County Donegal constituencies
Earls Erne